Pablo Almazán (born 9 February 1989) is a Spanish professional basketball player who plays as a small forward for Coosur Real Betis of the Liga ACB.

References

External links
Liga ACB profile
Pablo Almazán at RealGM

Living people
1989 births
Baloncesto Málaga players
Basket Zaragoza players
CB Breogán players
Liga ACB players
Real Betis Baloncesto players
Spanish men's basketball players
Sportspeople from Granada
Small forwards